Milkovsky District is an administrative and municipal district (raion) of Kamchatka Krai, Russia, one of the eleven in the krai. It is located in the southern central part of the krai. Its administrative center is the rural locality (a selo) of Milkovo. Population:  The population of Milkovo accounts for 78.0% of the district's total population.

Ethnic composition (2010):
 Russians – 75.5%
 Kamchadals – 10.2%
 Itelmens – 5.8%
 Ukrainians – 4.0%
 Others – 4.4%

References

Notes

Sources

Districts of Kamchatka Krai